Give Me Moonlight  is a 2001 Russian comedy film directed by Dmitry Astrakhan.

Plot 
The film tells about the television journalist Sergei Kupriyanov, who began to make his own broadcast. But his success could not fill the void in his family relationships. His wife, Irina, is leaving for St. Petersburg, and in the meantime, he is having an affair with his colleague Lena. Suddenly, Irina returns home and now Sergey has to make a difficult choice.

Cast 
 Natalya Andreychenko as Irina Kupriyanov
 Nikolai Yeremenko Jr. as Sergei Kupriyanov
 Igor Dmitriev as Eduard Sorokin
 Sergey Dreyden as Pyotr Semyonovich Mankin, prophet
 Vladimir Gostyukhin as Sergei Petrov
 Raisa Ryazanova		as Lydia Petrovna
 Olesya Sudzilovskaya as Lena
 Olga Sutulova as Sergei's and Irina's daughter
 Oleg Tabakov as cameo
 Aleksandr Efremov  as Vladimir Fyodorovich

References

External links 
 

2001 films
2000s Russian-language films
Russian comedy films
Films directed by Dmitry Astrakhan
2001 comedy films
Films set in Moscow
Films set in Saint Petersburg
Russian romantic comedy-drama films